Pliego is a municipality in the autonomous region of Murcia in southeastern Spain. It is situated in the River Mula county. It has a population of 3,868 (INE 2021). It is a small town near the beautiful Mountain Nature Park of the nearby Sierra Espuna Mountains with surrounding countryside of olive, almonds and apricot groves.

Latitude: 37º 58' 59" N

Longitude: 001º 30' 00" O.

The municipality is located on the north slope of the Sierra Espuna mountains. It is in the meadow created by the Pliego river, a tributary of the Mula river, a current that flows into the Segura river.

The municipality is an enclave, surrounded on all sides by Mula.

Pliego is a pretty historical Spanish town with a mainly Spanish population with some English residents and other nationalities who have settled there. It consists of old and new architecture with a central Town Square and Town Hall.

The geography of Pliego allows for hiking, rock-climbing, mountain biking, and spelunking.

It has all other amenities, a Church, banks, post-office, doctors surgery, large supermarket, shops, eating-places, bars and weekly open market. It is close to the larger town of Mula, the Motorway, the City of Murcia, Airports and many Coastal towns.

See also
 River Mula.

References

Municipalities in the Region of Murcia